Super Bagting 101.3 (DXHL 101.3 MHz) is an FM station owned by Capitol Broadcasting Center and operated by Pacific Mass Media Production Corporation. Its studios and transmitter are located at The Margarette Business Hotel, Sayre Highway, Maramag, Bukidnon.

References

External links
Radio Kidlat FB Page

Radio stations in Bukidnon
Radio stations established in 2018